Lurk, lurker, or lurking may refer to:

 Lurker, a person who often reads discussions on internet networks but seldom contributes to them.
 Lurk, a single long pole held with both hands, used in telemark skiing
 Lurking variable, or a confounding variable, in statistics
 Lorelei, nicknamed "Lurking Rock", a rock on the eastern bank of the Rhine River near St. Goarshausen, Germany

Entertainment
 The Lurkers, 1970s English punk rock group
 Lurk (Dungeons & Dragons)
 Lurk, another name for a vampire in the Buffy the Vampire Slayer spin-off comic Fray
 Lurk, a character in the 1972 British comedy film Up the Front
 Lurk, another name for a myrddraal, a fictional shadowspawn species in the Wheel of Time series
 Lurk (TV series), 2009 Chinese TV series
 Lurking Unknown, a fictional Marvel Comics character
 The Lurkers, a 2004-2005 IDW Publishing comics series

See also
 
 
 The Lurking Fear, a 1923 horror fiction short story by H. P. Lovecraft
 Lurking in Suburbia, a 2006 comedy film
 Idle (disambiguation)